is a Buddhist temple in Fushimi, Kyoto, Japan, built by former-Emperor Toba in 1137. The temple houses a number of Important Cultural Properties and the emperors Toba and Konoe are buried in the grounds. The Ashikaga estate from which the Ashikaga clan derived its name once belonged to Anrakuju-in.

Important Cultural Properties
  (Heian period)
  (Heian period)
  (Heian period)
 inscribed  (1287)

See also

Insei system
Daijō Tennō
Sennyū-ji

References

External links
 Anrakuju-in homepage

Buddhist temples in Kyoto